The Indian River is a river in Yukon, Canada. It is in the Bering Sea drainage basin and is a right tributary of the Yukon River.

Course
It flows northwest, then turns west to reach its mouth at the Yukon River.

Geology
The river is a gravel-bed stream located south of Dawson City. It lies on the Klondike Plateau, and forms the southern boundary of the Yukon placer gold district. Indian River and its tributaries are the largest gold producers in the Yukon. In 2001, the river produced  of gold. In 2008, Klondike Star Mineral Corporation announced plans to further develop the gold resources of the river.

Tributaries
Bertha Creek (right)
Nine Mile Creek (right)
Ophir Creek (right)
Ruby Creek (left)
Quartz Creek (right)
McKinnon Creek (left)
New Zealand Creek (right)
Montana Creek (left)
Eureka Creek (left)

Further reading
 An account of working a season at a placer gold mining camp in the Indian River valley; mentions Quartz Creek and Ruby Creek tributaries, and Little Blanche Creek sub-tributary.

See also
List of rivers of Yukon

References 

Rivers of Yukon
Tributaries of the Yukon River